Albert Hodges Morehead, Jr. (August 7, 1909 – October 5, 1966) was a writer for The New York Times, a bridge player, a lexicographer, and an author and editor of reference works.

Early years

Morehead was born in Flintstone, Taylor County, Georgia on August 7, 1909, to Albert Hodges Morehead I (1854–1922) and Bianca Noa (1874–1945). Albert senior was a choral conductor. Bianca's brother was Loveman Noa, the Naval hero. Albert's siblings were: Kerenhappuch Turner Morehead (1905–1907) who died as an infant; and James Turner Morehead (1906–1988). His parents lived in Lexington, Kentucky, but were spending their summer in Georgia at the time of his birth. The family moved to Chattanooga, Tennessee, after the death of Albert's father in 1922 in Baylor County, Texas. 

He attended the Baylor School and later Harvard University. In 1939, Albert Morehead married Loy Claudon (1910–1970) of Illinois, and the couple had two children: Philip David Morehead (b. 1942) and Andrew Turner Morehead (b. 1940). He was a noted bridge partner of U.S. General Dwight D. Eisenhower.

Journalism

Through high school and college, Morehead worked on the Lexington Herald (now the Herald-Leader), the Chattanooga Times, the Chicago Daily News, The Plain Dealer, and the Town Crier of Newton, Massachusetts. He later worked for The New York Times. 

In 1944 he published 36 articles, under four pseudonyms, in Redbook magazine, and in 1951 published 29 articles in Cosmopolitan''' magazine. From 1945 to 1947, he was the puzzle and quiz editor for Coronet magazine and was the consulting editor for games in Esquire magazine.  Starting in 1946 he was a consultant to the United States Playing Card Company, and he was vice president and general manager of Kem Plastic Playing Cards, Inc. for three years. 

He was author, co-author or editor of over 60 books, including books on games and puzzles, and a number of reference works, some of which are still in print. He edited W. Somerset Maugham's Great Novelists and their Novels (Winston, 1948) and Fulton Oursler's The Greatest Story Ever Told (Doubleday, 1949). 

Finally, he served as Vice-president of the John C. Winston Company, a book publisher, for three years.

Bridge

Bridge was a lifelong pursuit for Morehead. From 1927 on, he played in bridge tournaments, and in 1932, during the depression he was hired as a writer for Ely Culbertson's magazine, The Bridge World. In 1938 he was made editor, and in 1939 he became the general manager of all of Culbertson's bridge publications. In 1934, he won the Charles M. Schwab Trophy, and served as both president and chairman of the board of the American Contract Bridge League. He later wrote The New York Times bridge column for more than 25 years.

Publications

 
 
 

Death

Morehead died of cancer in 1966 in Manhattan.

Bridge accomplishments

Honors
 ACBL Hall of Fame, Blackwood Award 1996
 ACBL Honorary Member of the Year 1946

Awards
 IBPA Bridge Book of the Year 1966

Wins
 Schwab Cup (1) 1934

Runners-up
 North American Bridge Championships (1)
 Chicago (now Reisinger) (1) 1935

References

 Literature 
 Morehead, Albert and Geoffrey Mott-Smith (1950). Culbertson's Hoyle: The New Encyclopedia of Games, with Official Rules''. Greystone Press.

External links
 
 "A Tribute to Albert H. Morehead" subsite at Phil & Pat Morehead 

 

1909 births
1966 deaths
American contract bridge players
Contract bridge writers
American columnists
American Presbyterians
American magazine editors
American book editors
The New York Times writers
Writers from Georgia (U.S. state)
Writers from New York (state)
Harvard University alumni
People from Manhattan
People from Taylor County, Georgia
20th-century American non-fiction writers